Baqerabad Castle (Persian: قلعه باقرآباد) is a Qajar era castle in Bafq county, Yazd province, Iran.

The castle was built on the order of Abdorrahim Khan Bafqi, son of Mohammad Taqi khan Bafqi in 3 stages, making a Qanat in 1902 and building the northern tower, adding the southern tower 10 years later, and constructing a wall in 1919 due to regional insecurities.

The castle has 45 rooms and 2 watchtowers. It was constructed as a shelter for the people of the village against bandits and was at times used as a grains stockpile.

The castle was listed among the national heritage sites of Iran with the number 13000 on August 13, 2005.

References 

Castles in Iran
Tourist attractions in Yazd Province